Songs for Ships and Irons is a 1991 collection of non-album singles and B-sides by Cardiacs. It combines the whole of the Big Ship extended play, the whole of the "There's Too Many Irons In The Fire" 12-inch single and the B-sides of the "Susannah's Still Alive" 12-inch single. It also includes a bonus song called "Everything is Easy," a longstanding live favorite not previously released as a studio recording. Some of the quiet talking in between tracks from the original Big Ship mini-album differs from the original release in having been edited/lowered in volume.

The album was out of print, but is available from the Cardiacs website.

Track listing 
All songs written by Tim Smith unless otherwise indicated.

Personnel
Tim Smith – guitar, vocals
Jim Smith – bass
Sarah Smith – saxophone
William D. Drake – keyboards
Dominic Luckman – drums
Tim Quy – percussion

References

External links
 Cardiacs website

Cardiacs compilation albums
1991 compilation albums